Félix Betancourt (12 October 1945 – 22 July 2014) was a Cuban boxer. He competed in the men's light welterweight event at the 1964 Summer Olympics.

References

1945 births
2014 deaths
Cuban male boxers
Olympic boxers of Cuba
Boxers at the 1964 Summer Olympics
Sportspeople from Santiago de Cuba
Light-welterweight boxers
20th-century Cuban people